Dhumbarahi is a place located in the Kathmandu district of Nepal. The name of the place is derived from the temple of Dhumra Barah, thus the name Dhumbarahi.

Dhumbarahi Chowk
The middle part of Dhumbarahi which is next to the Ring Road.

Dhumbarahi Height
Dhumbarahi Height is a small upland just on the left towards Dhumbarahi Chowk.

Kathmandu District